Juan Marino Cabello (1920–2007) was a Chilean composer, writer, screenwriter, bandleader and lyricist.

1920 births
2007 deaths
Chilean composers
Chilean male composers
Chilean male writers
People from Punta Arenas
20th-century male musicians